Pyhäselkä is a lake in Finland. It forms the northernmost part of the Saimaa lake system.

References

External links
 

Saimaa
Lakes of Rääkkylä
Lakes of Liperi